Alia Saeed Mohammed (born Medina Kadir on 18 May 1991 in Ethiopia) is a long-distance runner who competes for the United Arab Emirates. She switched allegiance from her native Ethiopia in 2010. She was the 10,000 metres gold medallist at the 2014 Asian Games and the 2015 Asian Athletics Championships. She took the Silver at the 2017 Asian Athletics Championships

Competition record

Personal bests
Outdoor
 800 metres – 2:06.0 (Addis Ababa 2008)
 3000 metres – 8:55.40 (Sollentuna 2015)
 5000 metres – 15:00.45 (Baku 2017)
 10,000 metres – 31:10.25 (Dubai 2016)
 10 kilometres – 32:20 (Dubai 2015)
Indoor
 3000 metres – 8:48.27 (Stockholm 2014)
 5000 metres – 15:34.70 (Stockholm 2017)

References

External links
 

1991 births
Living people
Emirati female long-distance runners
Ethiopian female long-distance runners
Asian Games gold medalists for the United Arab Emirates
Asian Games medalists in athletics (track and field)
Athletes (track and field) at the 2014 Asian Games
Athletes (track and field) at the 2018 Asian Games
World Athletics Championships athletes for the United Arab Emirates
Ethiopian emigrants to the United Arab Emirates
Athletes (track and field) at the 2016 Summer Olympics
Olympic athletes of the United Arab Emirates
Medalists at the 2014 Asian Games
Islamic Solidarity Games medalists in athletics
21st-century Ethiopian women
21st-century Emirati women